Hungary participated at the 2010 Winter Olympics in Vancouver, British Columbia, Canada.

Alpine skiing

Biathlon

Cross-country skiing

Figure skating

Hungary qualified 1 entrant in ladies singles and 1 in ice dancing, for a total of 3 athletes.

Short track speed skating

Hungary qualified 7 short track speed skaters.

Men

Women

Lajtos was the reserve and did not compete.

See also
 Hungary at the Olympics
 Hungary at the 2010 Winter Paralympics

References

Winter Olympics
Nations at the 2010 Winter Olympics
2010